Ovarian hyperstimulation may refer to:

Controlled ovarian hyperstimulation
Ovarian hyperstimulation syndrome